Preachers of L.A. is an American reality television series that premiered October 9, 2013, on Oxygen. Preachers of L.A. chronicles the lives of three bishops and three pastors from their work within the church to their personal lives at home. The preachers are adherents of prosperity theology, an offshoot of Pentecostalism. The series also encompasses the spouses of the men.

In January 2014, Oxygen renewed the series for a second season with the original cast returning. It was announced that a spin-off Preachers of Detroit will debut on Oxygen in winter 2015. Potential spin-offs in New York City, Atlanta and Dallas have also been mentioned.

Cast
Pastor Wayne Chaney Jr.
Pastor Deitrick Haddon
Pastor Jay Haizlip is a professional skateboarder, pastor, and reality television personality. He is married to Christy Haizlip, and the couple have two sons and a daughter together. The couple are featured on the Oxygen reality television series Preachers of L.A. Haizlip was a drug user in his earlier years, but is now a pastor at The Sanctuary, a megachurch located in Costa Mesa, California.
Bishop Ron Gibson
Bishop Noel Jones
Bishop Clarence McClendon

Episodes

Series overview

Season 1 (2013)

Season 2 (2014)

References

2010s American reality television series
2013 American television series debuts
English-language television shows
African-American reality television series
Oxygen (TV channel) original programming
Television shows set in Los Angeles